Ksenia Ovsyanick (Russian: Ксения Овсяник; born September 5, 1989) is a Belorussian-British ballet dancer who, as of December 2022, is a principal dancer with the Berlin State Ballet and an international guest performing artist.

Personal life 
Born in Soviet Russia to a psychologist mother and an economist father. She has two older sisters, one an Israeli economist and a second, Alena Yiv Israeli actress and director.

Ovsyanick married artist Zdenek Konvalina in 2014.

Career 
Ovsyanick started her ballet training at the Belorussian State Ballet College; following her win at the Prix de Lausanne competition in Switzerland, she continued her studies at the English National Ballet School in London and eventually joined English National Ballet in 2008.

A year later, she performed her first principal role Giselle for which she was nominated for English National Ballet's Emerging dancer award.

In 2012 Ksenia had the title role of Firebird choreographed for her in the world premiere of "Firebird" by George Williamson, which brought her the UK Critics’ Circle National Dance Award for outstanding performance.

In 2013 Ms. Ovsyanick was nominated for "Prix Benois de la Danse" best female dancer award, and in 2018 she won "Dance Open" international Ballet Award in St. Petersburg.

In 2016 she joined the Berlin State Ballet as a Principal dancer. In 2019/2020, she was also a guest artist with the Polish national ballet.

Over the years, Ovsyanick performed on stages around the world on all 6 continents and created roles with current choreographers such as Nacho Duato, Alexander Ekman, Itzik Galili, Alexei Ratmansky, Richard Siegal, Liam Scarlett, George Williamson, Yabin Wang while performing a broad repertoire of classical and contemporary ballets.

Parallel with performing on stage, Ovsyanick was famous for her collaborations beyond the stage with art galleries, artists, fashion designers, filmmakers and producing dancers' message during the early COVID-19 pandemic "From Berlin with love", which many dance companies worldwide responded to with creating their own.

Ovsyanick collaborated with British sculptor Simon Gudgeon who created a series of outdoor sculptures exhibited throughout the UK winning several awards.

Awards 
 "PREMIO ECCELENZA DELLA DANZA 2023" Noto, Italy 
 DANCE OPEN International Award 2018, ST.PETERSBURG
 BENOIS DE LA DANS 2013, best female dancer nomination, MOSCOW
 Outstanding classical performance, NATIONAL DANCE AWARD 2012, LONDON 
 Prizewinner at the Beijing International Ballet Competition 2006
 Prizewinner at the Prix de Lausanne 2007
 Silver Medal at the International Ballet Competition in Harkov 2004

References 

1989 births
Living people
21st-century ballet dancers
Prima ballerinas
Prix Benois de la Danse winners